Norman Brookes and Anthony Wilding were the defending champions, but Brookes did not participate. Wilding partnered with Major Ritchie and they defeated Herbert Roper Barrett and Arthur Gore 6–1, 6–2, 1–6, 9–7 in the all comers' final to win the gentlemen's doubles tennis title at the 1908 Wimbledon Championships.

Draw

All comers' finals

Top half

Section 1

Section 2

Bottom half

Section 3

Section 4

References

External links

Men's Doubles
Wimbledon Championship by year – Men's doubles